Independence Peak or  Qullai Istiqlol, at , is the seventh-highest peak in the Pamir Mountains, located at the center of Tajikistan's Gorno-Badakhshan Autonomous Province, above the source of the Yazgulem River in the Yazgulem Range. The mountain consists of three snow- and ice-covered summits and its northwest face is the source of the Fedchenko Glacier.

The peak was originally named Dreispitz by a joint Russian–German team who discovered it in 1928, but failed to climb it due to deep snow and avalanche danger. The first ascent was made in 1954 by a Russian team led by A. Ugarov. After World War II, Dreispitz was renamed Revolution Peak (Qullai Inkilob), and in July 2006 it was given its current name.

See also
 List of Ultras of Central Asia

References

External links
 A description of Revolution Peak and its surroundings, with images
 
 Revolution Peak renamed Independence Peak by Resolution No. 297 of the Government of the Republic of Tajikistan, July 4, 2006.

Mountains of Tajikistan
Six-thousanders of the Pamir